Lipnik  is a village in Opatów County, Świętokrzyskie Voivodeship, in south-central Poland. It is the seat of the gmina (administrative district) called Gmina Lipnik.

The village has a population of 400.

References

Villages in Opatów County
Radom Governorate
Kielce Voivodeship (1919–1939)